John le Bury was the member of Parliament for Gloucester in the 14th English Parliament of 1315. The monarch at the time was Edward II.

References 

Year of birth missing
Year of death missing
Members of the Parliament of England (pre-1707) for Gloucester